Chaplain (Major General) Gaylord Thomas "G.T." Gunhus (May 22, 1940 – May 27, 2016) was an American Army officer who, from 1999 to 2003, served as the 20th Chief of Chaplains of the United States Army. He is a 1962 Graduate of Seattle Pacific University where he was named Alumnus of the Year in the spring of 2001.  He later graduated from the Lutheran Brethren Seminary in 1967 with a Masters of Divinity degree.

After seminary, Gunhus served two tours in the Vietnam War.  He graduated from the Princeton Theological Seminary in 1976 with a Masters in Theology degree. He continued his way up the ranks during the next three decades before being named Chief of Chaplains of the US Army in 1999 by President Bill Clinton.  He was the head chaplain for the army based at The Pentagon prior to, during, and after the 9/11 attacks on the Pentagon.  He continued in this role until his retirement in 2003.  After retirement, he was the military correspondent for Guideposts magazine.  General Gunhus died on May 27, 2016 at the Mayo Clinic in Scottsdale, Arizona.

Awards and decorations

References

Further reading

1940 births
2016 deaths
Deputy Chiefs of Chaplains of the United States Army
United States Army generals
Recipients of the Legion of Merit
People from Enderlin, North Dakota
Chiefs of Chaplains of the United States Army
United States Army personnel of the Vietnam War
Vietnam War chaplains
War in Afghanistan (2001–2021) chaplains
Recipients of the Air Medal
20th-century American clergy
21st-century American clergy